Andheri Vidhan Sabha seat was one of the constituencies of Maharashtra Legislative Assembly, in India. Andheri seat existed until the 2004 elections after which it became defunct when the map of constituencies in India was redrawn. In 2008, two new vidhan sabha seats (Andheri East and Andheri West) were created covering this area.

Members of Vidhan Sabha

Election Results

1967 Vidhan Sabha Elections
 V. G. Rawal (INC) : 24,666 votes 
 B. S. Bhume (IND) : 23,565

1980 Vidhan Sabha Elections
 Chandrakant Tripathi (INC-I) : 25,073 votes 
 Neelkanth Samant (BJP) : 13,283

2004 Vidhan Sabha Elections
 Suresh Shetty (INC) : 96,514 votes 
 Ravindra Dattaram Waikar (SHS) : 87,445

See also
 List of constituencies of Maharashtra Legislative Assembly

References

Mumbai City district
Assembly constituencies of Mumbai
Former assembly constituencies of Maharashtra